Schwager (meaning brother in law in German) may refer to:

 Brian Schwager, American musician
 Dietmar Schwager (1940–2018), German footballer and manager
 Dominik Schwager (born 1976), German auto racing driver
 Irma Schwager (1920–2015), Austrian World War II resistance fighter and politician
 Jack D. Schwager (born 1948), American author and investment manager
 Patricia Schwager (born 1983), Swiss racing cyclist
 Raymund Schwager (1935–2004), Swiss Roman Catholic theologian
 Yisha'ayahu Schwager (1946–2000), Israeli footballer